Rowan Lyle (born 1 December 1968) is a South African cricketer. He played in 40 first-class and 40 List A matches between 1988/89 and 1996/97.

See also
 List of Eastern Province representative cricketers

References

External links
 

1968 births
Living people
South African cricketers
Eastern Province cricketers
KwaZulu-Natal cricketers
Gauteng cricketers
People from Kokstad